In the physical sciences, a particle (or corpuscule in older texts) is a small localized object which can be described by several physical or chemical properties, such as volume, density, or mass. They vary greatly in size or quantity, from subatomic particles like the electron, to microscopic particles like atoms and molecules, to macroscopic particles like powders and other granular materials. Particles can also be used to create scientific models of even larger objects depending on their density, such as humans moving in a crowd or celestial bodies in motion.

The term particle is rather general in meaning, and is refined as needed by various scientific fields. Anything that is composed of particles may be referred to as being particulate. However, the noun particulate is most frequently used to refer to pollutants in the Earth's atmosphere, which are a suspension of unconnected particles, rather than a connected particle aggregation.

Conceptual properties

The concept of particles is particularly useful when modelling nature, as the full treatment of many phenomena can be complex and also involve difficult computation. It can be used to make simplifying assumptions concerning the processes involved. Francis Sears and Mark Zemansky, in University Physics, give the example of calculating the landing location and speed of a baseball thrown in the air. They gradually strip the baseball of most of its properties, by first idealizing it as a rigid smooth sphere, then by neglecting rotation, buoyancy and  friction, ultimately reducing the problem to the ballistics of a classical point particle. The treatment of large numbers of particles is the realm of statistical physics.

Size

The term "particle" is usually applied differently to three classes of sizes. The term macroscopic particle, usually refers to particles much larger than atoms and molecules. These are usually abstracted as point-like particles, even though they have volumes, shapes, structures, etc. Examples of macroscopic particles would include powder, dust, sand, pieces of debris during a car accident, or even objects as big as the stars of a galaxy.

Another type, microscopic particles usually refers to particles of sizes ranging from atoms to molecules, such as carbon dioxide, nanoparticles, and colloidal particles. These particles are studied in chemistry, as well as atomic and molecular physics. The smallest of particles are the subatomic particles, which refer to particles smaller than atoms. These would include particles such as the constituents of atoms – protons, neutrons, and electrons – as well as other types of particles which can only be produced in particle accelerators or cosmic rays. These particles are studied in particle physics.

Because of their extremely small size, the study of microscopic and subatomic particles fall in the realm of quantum mechanics. They will exhibit phenomena demonstrated in the particle in a box model, including wave–particle duality, and whether particles can be considered distinct or identical is an important question in many situations.

Composition

Particles can also be classified according to composition. Composite particles refer to particles that have composition – that is particles which are made of other particles. For example, a carbon-14 atom is made of six protons, eight neutrons, and six electrons. By contrast, elementary particles (also called fundamental particles) refer to particles that are not made of other particles. According to our current understanding of the world, only a very small number of these exist, such as leptons, quarks, and gluons. However it is possible that some of these  might turn up to be composite particles after all, and merely appear to be elementary for the moment. While composite particles can very often be considered point-like, elementary particles are truly punctual.

State of it
Both elementary (such as muons) and composite particles (such as uranium nuclei), are known to undergo particle decay. Those fail to undergo particle decay are called stable particles, such as the electron or a helium-4 nucleus. The lifetime of stable particles can be either infinite or large enough to hinder attempts to observe such decays. In the latter case, those particles are called "observationally stable". In general, a particle decays from a high-energy state to a lower-energy state by emitting some form of radiation, such as the emission of photons.

N-body simulation

In computational physics, N-body simulations (also called N-particle simulations) are simulations of dynamical systems of particles under the influence of certain conditions, such as being subject to gravity. These simulations are very common in cosmology and computational fluid dynamics.

N refers to the number of particles considered. As simulations with higher N are more computationally intensive, systems with large numbers of actual particles will often be approximated to a smaller number of particles, and simulation algorithms need to be optimized through various methods.

Distribution of particles

Colloidal particles are the components of a colloid. A colloid is a substance microscopically dispersed evenly throughout another substance. Such colloidal system can be solid, liquid, or gaseous; as well as continuous or dispersed. The dispersed-phase particles have a diameter of between approximately 5 and 200 nanometers. Soluble particles smaller than this will form a solution as opposed to a colloid. Colloidal systems (also called colloidal solutions or colloidal suspensions) are the subject of interface and colloid science.  Suspended solids may be held in a liquid, while solid or liquid particles suspended in a gas together form an aerosol. Particles  may also be suspended in the form of atmospheric particulate matter, which may constitute air pollution. Larger particles can similarly form marine debris or space debris. A conglomeration of discrete solid, macroscopic particles may be described as a granular material.

See also

References

Further reading

Broad-concept articles
Matter

scn:Particedda